Microcella alkaliphila is a Gram-positive bacterium from the genus of Microcella which has been isolated from alkaline groundwater from Cabeço de Vide, Southern Portugal.

References

Microbacteriaceae
Bacteria described in 2006